Joy Esther (born 14 June 1984) is a French–Spanish actress and singer.

Life and career 
Joy Esther was born in Lyon. As a child, she took classes of singing and theatre, in addition to football, athletics and judo. She then took classes at the Cours Florent for three years. She also took lessons of modern dance and learnt to play guitar as an autodidact.

She started her career at the age of eight appearing in some advertisements like Kodak, working with photographers Jean-Baptiste Mondino and Jean-Paul Goude.

From age 11 to 18, she played in a number of films and television films, taking at the same time classes of theater, singing, guitar and piano during her studies. She began her acting career in the theater play Poussez pas y aura d'la place by Jean-Yves Brignon.

At age 19, she had one of the three main roles in the musical comedy Belles belles belles played at the Olympia in Paris for two months.

In 2006, she played the role of Juliet in the musical comedy Roméo et Juliette, de la Haine à l'Amour for an Asian tour. Over 200 shows were played in Seoul, South Korea and Taipei, Taiwan, following 40 shows in Paris at the Palais des Congrès in 2010. From October 2012 to January 2013, the show was played in Japan in Tokyo and Osaka, and later in China in Shanghai.

In the meantime, she continued playing in various series and television films. From spring 2012 to June 2017, she portrays Chloé Varenko in the comedy series Nos Chers Voisins broadcast on TF1.

She was a contestant at the eighth season of Danse avec les stars broadcast on TF1 since 14 October 2017. She was eliminated on 2 December 2017 just before the semi-final against Tatiana Silva.

Personal life 
Joy Esther married in September 2009 French singer Damien Sargue in Las Vegas. They separated in late 2010.

Filmography

Television

Theatre

References

External links 

 
 

French women singers
1984 births
Actresses from Lyon
Living people
French child actresses
French film actresses
French television actresses
French musical theatre actresses
Cours Florent alumni
21st-century French actresses
French people of Spanish descent